De Barros may refer to:

People
 Adhemar de Barros (1901-1969), Brazilian politician
  Adhemir de Barros (b. 1942), Brazilian footballer known as Paraná (footballer)
 Adriana de Barros (b. 1976), Portuguese and Canadian illustrator, web designer, and poet
 António Thomas Santos de Barros (b. 1986), Brazilian footballer known as Thomaz (footballer)
 Bruno de Barros (b. 1987), Brazilian sprinter
 Cássio Alves de Barros (b. 1970), Brazilian footballer
 Fabiana de Barros (b. 1957), Swiss artist of Brazilian origin
 Fortunato de Barros (b. 1916), Brazilian fencer
 Henrique de Barros (1904-2000), Portuguese politician
 João de Barros (1496-1570), Portuguese historian
 João Ribeiro de Barros (1900-1947), Brazilian aviator
 Jose Acacio de Barros (b. 1967), Brazilian-American physicist and philosopher
 José Leitão de Barros (1896-1967), Portuguese film director and playwright
 Luísa de Barros, Countess of Barral ( ? - ? ), Brazilian noble
 Luiz de Barros (1893-1982), Brazilian film director, film producer, film editor, screenwriter, cinematographer, film actor, and set designer and manager
 Manoel de Barros (1916-2014), Brazilian poet
 Maria de Barros (b. ? ), Senegalese-born Cape Verdean singer
 Osvaldo Velloso de Barros (1908-1996), Brazilian footballer
 Rui Duarte de Barros (b. 1960), Transitional Prime Minister of Guinea-Bissau (2012-2014)
 Théo de Barros (b. 1943), Brazilian composer
 Túlio Henrique Gomes de Barros (b. 1987), Brazilian footballer
 Viriato de Barros (b. ? ), Cape Verdean writer

Other
 Estádio Cornélio de Barros, a stadium in Salgueiro, Brazil
 Estádio Wilson Fernandes de Barros, former name of Estádio Romildo Vitor Gomes Ferreira, a stadium in Moji-Mirim, São Paulo, Brazil
 Rodovia Adhemar de Barros, a highway in the state of São Paulo, Brazil
 Tierra de Barros, a comarca in Badajoz, Extremadura, Spain